Miyashita is a Japanese surname. Notable people with the surname include:

, Japanese voice actor
, Japanese volleyball player
, Japanese Go player
, Japanese politician
, Japanese swimmer
, Japanese actress
, Japanese handball player
, Japanese women's basketball player
, Japanese footballer
, Japanese hurdler
, Japanese actress
, Japanese singer and actor

See also
Miyashita Park, a park in Shibuya, Tokyo, Japan
Miyashita Dam, a dam in Fukushima Prefecture, Japan

Japanese-language surnames